PANoptosis is an inflammatory cell death pathway. Consideration of the totality of biological effects from cell death in multiple studies has led to the conceptualization of PANoptosis, a unique innate immune inflammatory cell death pathway regulated by multifaceted PANoptosome complexes that have been visualized in single cells to integrate components from other cell death pathways. PANoptosis is implicated in driving innate immune responses and inflammation and cannot be individually accounted for by pyroptosis, apoptosis, or necroptosis alone. PANoptosome formation and PANoptosis occur during pathogenic infections, including bacterial, viral, and fungal infections, as well as during inflammatory diseases and can be beneficial in the context of cancer.

Inflammatory cell death is associated with activation of the immune system through the release of cytokines and damage-associated molecular patterns. Live pathogens that carry multiple pathogen-associated molecular patterns and homeostasis-altering triggers can modulate cell death pathways. Pyroptosis (inflammatory caspase-mediated cell death that drives maturation of the cytokines IL-1β and IL-18) and necroptosis (RIPK1/RIPK3/MLKL-driven cell death) were historically described as two major inflammatory cell death pathways, with recent studies describing PANoptosis as an additional inflammatory cell death pathway.

Activation of PANoptosis can clear infected cells for host defense, and it has shown preclinical promise as an anti-cancer strategy. For example, PANoptosis is important for host defense during influenza, Francisella, and herpes simplex virus 1 infections. Additionally, treatment of cancer cells with the PANoptosis-inducing agents TNF and IFN-γ can reduce tumor size in preclinical models. The combination of the nuclear export inhibitor selinexor and IFN can also cause PANoptosis and regress tumors in preclinical models. However, excess activation of PANoptosis can be associated with inflammation, inflammatory disease, and cytokine storm syndromes. Treatments that block TNF and IFN-γ to prevent PANoptosis have provided therapeutic benefit in preclinical models of cytokine storm syndromes, including cytokine shock, SARS-CoV-2 infection, sepsis, and hemophagocytic lymphohistiocytosis, suggesting the therapeutic potential of modulating this pathway. Further studies with beta-coronaviruses have shown that IFN can induce ZBP1-mediated PANoptosis during SARS-CoV-2 infection, thereby limiting the efficacy of IFN treatment during infection and resulting in morbidity and mortality. This suggests that inhibiting ZBP1 may improve the therapeutic efficacy of IFN therapy during SARS-CoV-2 infection and possibly other inflammatory conditions where IFN-mediated cell death and pathology occur.

References

Cell biology